Adolf von Trotha (1 March 1868 – 11 October 1940) was a German admiral in the Kaiserliche Marine. After the German revolution he briefly served as the first Chef der Admiralität, which replaced the imperial Reichsmarineamt. After supporting the Kapp-Lüttwitz Putsch of March 1920 he resigned his post.

Family
Trotha was born 1 March 1868 at Koblenz, at the time part of the Rhine Province of the Kingdom of Prussia. Trotha was the third son of Karl von Trotha (1834–1870), who was killed in the Franco-Prussian War, when his son was only two years old.

Trotha married Anna von Veltheim (15 January 1877 – 8 August 1964) on 4 June 1902, the daughter of Fritz von Veltheim and Elizabeth von Krosigk.

Military career/development
Trotha entered the Imperial Navy in 1886 as an officer candidate and was promoted to Leutnant zur See in 1891. He served as a commander of the torpedo boat D3 and as a navigations officer on the small cruiser SMS Seeadler.

In 1900 he was a staff officer at Tientsin. From 1914 to 1918, Trotha served in World War I. In 1916 he became Chief of Staff of the High Seas Fleet.

As Chef der Admiralität from March 1919 Trotha was a (non-voting) ex-officio member of the first two cabinets of the Weimar Republic, the Scheidemann cabinet and the Bauer cabinet from March 1919 until March 1920.

In March 1920, he supported the failed Kapp Putsch and resigned his post.

Trotha was the head of the Grossdeutscher Jugendbund and the Sudetendeutscher Heimatbund. In 1934 he became the president of the Deutscher Flottenverein.

After his death on 11 October 1940 a state funeral was held in Berlin.

Honours and awards

References

External links
 

1868 births
1940 deaths
Military personnel from Koblenz
People from the Rhine Province
Counter admirals of the Imperial German Navy
German National People's Party politicians
Imperial German Navy admirals of World War I
Admirals of the Kriegsmarine
Vice admirals of the Reichsmarine
Recipients of the Pour le Mérite (military class)
Recipients of the Iron Cross (1914), 1st class
Recipients of the Military Merit Cross (Mecklenburg-Schwerin), 1st class
Officers Crosses of the Military Merit Order (Bavaria)